Lurgan Cricket Club is a cricket club in Lurgan, County Armagh, Northern Ireland, playing in League 1 of the NCU Senior League.

The club was formed in 1922 by the amalgamation of Brownlow and Lurgan YMCA cricket clubs. After a short hiatus during the Second World War, it reformed in 1945 and rejoined the Northern Cricket Union. The club returned to the Senior League in 1952.

Honours
Irish Senior Cup: 3
1984, 1988, 1990
NCU Senior League: 1 (shared)
1990 (shared)
NCU Challenge Cup: 4
1972, 1989, 1996, 2002
NCU Junior Cup: †1
†2007

† Won by 2nd XI

References

External links
Lurgan Cricket Club

Cricket clubs in Northern Ireland
NCU Senior League members
1922 establishments in Northern Ireland
Cricket clubs in County Armagh
Sports clubs established in 1922